The Men's 5,000m T11 had its Final held on September 9 at 19:20.

Medalists

Results

References
Final

Athletics at the 2008 Summer Paralympics